The Cheap Detective is a 1978 American mystery comedy film written by Neil Simon and directed by Robert Moore.

It stars Peter Falk as Lou Peckinpaugh, a parody of Humphrey Bogart. The film is a parody of Bogart films such as Casablanca and The Maltese Falcon.

The ensemble cast includes Madeline Kahn, Louise Fletcher, Ann-Margret, Eileen Brennan, Stockard Channing, Marsha Mason, Sid Caesar, John Houseman, Dom DeLuise, Abe Vigoda, James Coco, Phil Silvers, Fernando Lamas, Nicol Williamson, Scatman Crothers, Vic Tayback and Paul Williams.

Plot
Lou Peckinpaugh (Peter Falk), a bumbling San Francisco private detective, tries to prove himself innocent of his partner's murder while helping a bizarre array of characters recover a lost treasure. A large amount of people are murdered in crazy death poses first, but he finds out from Pope Damascus that the people are all after a large egg-shaped diamond. Vladimir Korsokovowitz, who had the diamond is shot by his partner in the theft, Marcel, who has been bleeding for the past 30 years, and dies. At the end everyone confronts Peckinpaugh in his office, and find the diamond was actually a real egg.

Cast
 Peter Falk as Lou Peckinpaugh (Humphrey Bogart)
 Madeline Kahn as Mrs. Montenegro 
 Dom DeLuise as Pepe Damascus (Peter Lorre)
 Louise Fletcher as Marlene DuChard 
 Ann-Margret as Jezebel Dezire 
 Eileen Brennan as Betty DeBoop 
 Stockard Channing as Bess 
 Sid Caesar as Ezra Dezire
 Marsha Mason as Georgia Merkle
 John Houseman as Jasper Blubber (Sydney Greenstreet)
 Vic Tayback as Lieutenant DiMaggio 
 Abe Vigoda as Sgt. Rizzuto 
 Carmine Caridi as Sgt. Crosetti
 James Coco as Marcel 
 Phil Silvers as Hoppy 
 Fernando Lamas as Paul DuChard
 Nicol Williamson as Col. Schlissel
 James Cromwell as Schnell 
 Scatman Crothers as Tinker (Dooley Wilson)
 Paul Williams as Boy
 David Ogden Stiers as Captain
 John Calvin as Qvicker
 Arthur Tovey as Vladimir Korsokovowitz

Reception
The film grossed $5,113,743 in its opening weekend from 648 theaters, finishing third for the weekend behind Grease and Jaws 2 in their second weekends. Film critic Roger Ebert stated that "If you loved 'The Maltese Falcon' and can recite all  the best lines from 'Casablanca' by heart, you'll hate 'The Cheap Detective', which is basically just the year's classiest and most expensive rip-off."

A number of critics gave the film very positive reviews: The Fresno Bee noted that "Neil Simon has done it again. Written a film that is funny, entertaining, and a treat for old movie buffs."

Ed Mintz founded CinemaScore in 1979 after disliking The Cheap Detective despite being a fan of Neil Simon and hearing another disappointed attendee wanting to hear the opinions of ordinary people instead of critics.

See also
Murder by Death – a 1976 film featuring Falk as a similar character (another Sam Spade parody) that was written by Simon and directed by Moore.

References

External links
 
 
 
 
 
 

1978 films
1970s comedy mystery films
1970s crime comedy films
1970s parody films
American comedy mystery films
American crime comedy films
American detective films
American parody films
Columbia Pictures films
Films scored by Patrick Williams
Films directed by Robert Moore
Films set in San Francisco
Films set in the 1940s
Films with screenplays by Neil Simon
EMI Films films
1978 comedy films
1970s English-language films
1970s American films